The Honorable Congress of the State of Sonora is the legislative branch of  the government of the State of Sonora. The Congress is the governmental deliberative body of  Sonora, which is equal to, and independent of, the executive.

The Congress is unicameral and consists of 33 deputies. 21 deputies are elected on a first-past-the-post basis, one for each district in which the entity is divided, while 12 are elected through a system of proportional representation. Deputies are elected to serve for a three-year term.

Since its installation the congress has been renewed 63 times, hence the current session of the Congress of Sonora (whose term lasts from 2021 to 2024) is known as the LXIII Legislature.

Electoral Districts of the State of Sonora, Mexico

Legislatures of the State of Sonora, Mexico

Composition

The LXIII Legislature of the Congress of Sonora consists of 33 deputies.

History
Since 1917 the Congress has been composed as follows:

From 1917 to 1931 it was composed of 15 deputies.
From 1931 to 1970 it was composed of 9 deputies.
From 1970 to 1979 it was composed of 11 deputies.
From 1979 to 1982 it was composed of 19 deputies (15 elected by the first-past-the-post (FPP) system and 4 by the proportional representation system (PR).
From 1982 to 1988 it was composed of 24 deputies (18 elected by the FPP system and 6 by the PR system).
From 1988 to 1994 it was composed of 27 deputies (18 elected by the FPP system and 9 by the PR system.
Since 1994 the Congress is composed of 33 deputies (21 elected by the FPP system and 12 by the PR system.
The LVII Legislature (2003-2006) was composed of 31 deputies.
The current session is composed of 33 deputies (21 elected by the FPP system and 12 by the PR system.

See also
List of Mexican state congresses

External links
Congress of Sonora website
Sonora State Electoral Council

 
Sonora
Sonora